Brockton Edison Electric Illuminating Company Power Station or "Brockton Edison Company - Old Power Station" is a historic power plant at 70 School Street in Brockton, Massachusetts. It was one of the earliest power plants built by Thomas Edison.

The plant opened on October 1, 1883. It contained three "H" dynamos capable of powering about 1600 lamps.

The Brockton plant was soon followed by others in Lawrence, Massachusetts, Fall River and Newburgh, New York.

It was added to the National Register of Historic Places in 1987.

See also
Edison Illuminating Company
National Register of Historic Places listings in Plymouth County, Massachusetts

References

Energy infrastructure completed in 1883
Industrial buildings and structures on the National Register of Historic Places in Massachusetts
Energy infrastructure on the National Register of Historic Places
National Register of Historic Places in Plymouth County, Massachusetts